Escola Americana do Rio de Janeiro (EARJ, the American School of Rio de Janeiro) is a non-profit twin-campus international school located in Rio de Janeiro, Brazil.  The school was founded in 1937 as a private, independent, coeducational, non-denominational day school. EARJ offers an educational program from Nursery through Grade 12 for students of all nationalities. In 2019-20, enrolment was 1,200 students across the Gávea and Barra campuses with 160 members of teaching faculty.

Curriculum and Programs 
The curriculum is that of a U.S. college-preparatory independent day school for students from pre-school through Grade 12. Instruction is in English with Portuguese offered as an additional first or foreign language. Other available foreign languages include French and Spanish. Health, physical education, and computer classes are also run. Music, art, band, choir, drama, publications, athletics, and Model UN (Model United Nations) are among the extracurricular activities offered. There is no religious instruction. There are chapters of the National Honor Society, the Spanish Honor Society, French Honor Society and Mu Alpha Theta on campus. 

The school offers the American, Brazilian and International Baccalaureate Diplomas. Over 98% of the school’s graduates enroll in a college or university, with 75% of them going on to a higher learning institution in the U.S., 20% going on to a higher learning institution in Europe, Canada, Latin America and Asia and 5% enroll in universities in Brazil. The school is accredited by AdvancED and is the only school in the State of Rio de Janeiro to be designated by license as an international school, recognized by the Brazilian Ministry of Education and the Secretary of Education for the State of Rio de Janeiro. The School is affiliated with the International Baccalaureate Organization. EARJ sports teams compete against other schools in the Association of American Schools in Brazil (AASB) in soccer, basketball, volleyball, softball, futsal and cheerleading.

Campuses and Facilities 
The Gávea campus opened in 1971 and features eight towers that house the school’s Lower School and Upper School divisions. The towers together contain 78 classrooms, eight science laboratories. 

The two libraries with a collection totaling more than 30,000 titles have been closed.

In addition the Gávea campus has three gymnasiums, three music rooms, a cafeteria, an infirmary, snack bar, student store, security room, and a 350-seat auditorium. Athletic facilities include a lower school playground, indoor and outdoor courts, and playing field. The Barra campus opened in 2013 and provides purpose built learning, artistic and sporting facilities. The school contains two libraries.

Athletics 
EARJ students have the opportunity to participate in several interscholastic competitions. Along with a few other local competitions which vary through different sports, EARJ participates in Big 8 and Little 8 tournaments. EARJ's Boys Basketball Varsity team is the reigning Big 8 champion, as they conquered the 22-23 season title undefeated, getting EARJ their first ever Big 8 basketball gold. They went on to also conquer 2nd place in the first ever AASB National Final Four (Boys Basketball), closing off a historic season as the best ever boys basketball squad in the school's history. The Panthers' 22-23 season cheerleading squad also managed to secure the gold in the first ever Big 8 Cheerleading Competition.

See also
 Americans in Brazil

References

''Content has been adapted from a US Office of Overseas Schools report which can be found at: https://2001-2009.state.gov/m/a/os/1529.htm and updated by the school

External links 
School website
Carioca Yearbooks from 1944 through 1980
EARJ alumni website

International schools in Rio de Janeiro (city)
International Baccalaureate schools in Brazil
American international schools in Brazil
Association of American Schools in South America
1937 establishments in Brazil
Educational institutions established in 1937